Cephalocladia fulvicornis is a moth of the Megalopygidae family. It was described by Paul Dognin in 1923. It is found in Brazil.

References

Moths described in 1923
Megalopygidae